The 2002 NCAA Division I softball tournament was the twenty-first annual tournament to determine the national champion of NCAA women's collegiate softball. Held during May 2002, forty-eight Division I college softball teams contested the championship. The tournament featured eight regionals of six teams, each in a double elimination format. The 2002 Women's College World Series was held in Oklahoma City, Oklahoma from May 23 through May 27 and marked the conclusion of the 2002 NCAA Division I softball season.  California won their first NCAA championship by defeating Arizona 6–0 in the final game.  California pitcher Jocelyn Forest was named Women's College World Series Most Outstanding Player.

Qualifying

Regionals

Regional No. 1
Opening Round
 defeated , 3–0.
 defeated , 2–1.
 defeated , 2–1 (8 innings).

Loser's Bracket
UMBC defeated Liberty, 7–1.  Liberty eliminated.
Eastern Kentucky defeated UMBC, 6–1, UMBC eliminated.

Semifinals and Finals
Georgia defeated South Carolina, 1–0.
UCLA defeated Eastern Kentucky, 10–0 (5 innings).  Eastern Kentucky eliminated.
UCLA defeated Georgia, 2–1 (8 innings).
South Carolina defeated Georgia, 9–3.  Georgia eliminated.
South Carolina defeated UCLA, 2–1.
UCLA defeated South Carolina, 1–0.

UCLA advances to WCWS.

Regional No. 2
Opening Round
Arizona defeated , 4–1.
 defeated , 3–1.
 defeated , 2–1.

Loser's Bracket
Penn State defeated Boston University, 5–1.  Boston University eliminated.
Penn State defeated Princeton, 3–0.  Princeton eliminated.

Semifinals and Finals
DePaul defeated Minnesota, 2–0 (12 innings).
Arizona defeated Penn State, 4–3.  Penn State eliminated.
Arizona defeated DePaul, 2–0.
DePaul defeated Minnesota, 5–3.  Minnesota eliminated.
DePaul defeated Arizona, 6–0.
Arizona defeated DePaul, 8–0.

Arizona advances to WCWS.

Regional No. 3
Opening Round
 defeated , 3–2 (10 innings).
 defeated , 4–1.
 defeated , 5–3 (13 innings).

Loser's Bracket
Mississippi State defeated Northwestern State, 9–6.  Northwestern State eliminated.
Louisiana–Lafayette defeated Mississippi State, 10–3.  Mississippi State eliminated.

Semifinals and Finals
Arizona State defeated UMass, 1–0.
LSU defeated Louisiana–Lafayette, 5–2.  Louisiana–Lafayette eliminated.
Arizona State defeated LSU, 3–2 (8 innings).
LSU defeated UMass, 1–0.  UMass eliminated.
Arizona State defeated LSU, 4–1.

Arizona State advances to WCWS.

Regional No. 4
Opening Round
 defeated , 3–0.
 defeated , 7–0.
California defeated , 2–1 (10 innings).

Loser's Bracket
Pacific defeated Evansville, 6–0.  Evansville eliminated.
Fresno State defeated Pacific, 1–0.  Pacific eliminated.

Semifinals and Finals
California defeated Stanford, 1–0.
Cal State Fullerton defeated Fresno State, 1–0.  Fresno State eliminated.
California defeated Cal State Fullerton, 4–2.
Cal State Fullerton defeated Stanford, 4–1.  Stanford eliminated.
California defeated Cal State Fullerton, 1–0.

California advances to WCWS.

Regional No. 5
Opening Round
 defeated , 4–0.
 defeated , 6–0.
 defeated , 6–2.

Loser's Bracket
Army defeated Utah, 2–0.  Utah eliminated.
Arkansas defeated Army, 2–0.  Army eliminated.

Semifinals and Finals
Oklahoma defeated Texas A&M, 7–0.
Texas defeated Arkansas, 6–2.  Arkansas eliminated.
Oklahoma defeated Texas, 4–1.
Texas A&M defeated Texas, 2–1.  Texas eliminated.
Oklahoma defeated Texas A&M, 8–1.

Oklahoma advances to WCWS.

Regional No. 6
Opening Round
 defeated , 8–0 (5 innings).
 defeated , 5–0.
 defeated , 7–0.

Loser's Bracket
Oakland defeated Canisius, 3–1.  Canisius eliminated.
Central Michigan defeated Oakland, 2–1.  Oakland eliminated.

Semifinals and Finals
Michigan defeated Ohio State, 3–0.
Washington defeated Central Michigan, 4–1.  Central Michigan eliminated.
Michigan defeated Washington, 6–5.
Ohio State defeated Washington, 2–1.  Washington eliminated.
Michigan defeated Ohio State, 4–0.

Michigan advances to WCWS.

Regional No. 7
Opening Round
 defeated , 1–0.
 defeated , 1–0.
 defeated , 3–2.

Loser's Bracket
UIC defeated Wisconsin, 2–0.  Wisconsin eliminated.
Iowa defeated UIC, 3–1.  UIC eliminated.

Semifinals and Finals
Oregon State defeated Notre Dame, 2–0.
Nebraska defeated Iowa, 3–0.  Iowa eliminated.
Nebraska defeated Oregon State, 7–0.
Notre Dame defeated Oregon State, 2–0.  Oregon State eliminated.
Nebraska defeated Notre Dame, 5–3.

Nebraska advances to WCWS.

Regional No. 8
Opening Round
 defeated , 4–3.
 defeated , 3–1 (10 innings).
 defeated , 2–1.

Loser's Bracket
Florida Atlantic defeated Alabama, 2–1.  Alabama eliminated.
Florida Atlantic defeated Auburn, 4–2.  Auburn eliminated.

Semifinals and Finals
Georgia Tech defeated Florida State, 7–0.
Chattanooga defeated Florida Atlantic, 6–1.  Florida Atlantic eliminated.
Georgia Tech defeated Chattanooga, 3–0.
Florida State defeated Chattanooga, 1–0 (8 innings).  Chattanooga eliminated.
Florida State defeated Georgia Tech, 3–0.
Florida State defeated Georgia Tech, 6–1.

Florida State advances to WCWS.

Women's College World Series

Participants

*: Excludes Nebraska's vacated 1985 WCWS participation.
**: Excludes UCLA's vacated 1995 WCWS participation.

†: Excludes results of the pre-NCAA Women's College World Series of 1969 through 1981.

Results

Bracket

Game results

Championship game

All-Tournament Team
The following players were members of the All-Tournament Team:

References

2002 NCAA Division I softball season
NCAA Division I softball tournament